Almandine, also known as almandite, is a species of mineral belonging to the garnet group. The name is a corruption of alabandicus, which is the name applied by Pliny the Elder to a stone found or worked at Alabanda, a town in Caria in Asia Minor. Almandine is an iron alumina garnet, of deep red color, inclining to purple. It is frequently cut with a convex face, or en cabochon, and is then known as carbuncle. Viewed through the spectroscope in a strong light, it generally shows three characteristic absorption bands.

Almandine is one end-member of a mineral solid solution series, with the other end member being the garnet pyrope. The almandine crystal formula is: Fe3Al2(SiO4)3. Magnesium substitutes for the iron with increasingly pyrope-rich composition.

Almandine, Fe2+3Al2Si3O12, is the ferrous iron end member of the class of garnet minerals representing an important group of rock-forming silicates, which are the main constituents of the Earth's crust, upper mantle and transition zone. Almandine crystallizes in the cubic space group Iad, with unit-cell parameter a ≈ 11.512 Å at 100 K.

Almandine is antiferromagnetic with the Néel temperature of 7.5 K. It contains two equivalent magnetic sublattices.

Occurrence

Almandine occurs rather abundantly in the gem-gravels of Sri Lanka, whence it has sometimes been called Ceylon-ruby. When the color inclines to a violet tint, the stone is often called Syriam garnet, a name said to be taken from Syriam, an ancient town of Pegu (now part of Myanmar). Large deposits of fine almandine-garnets were found, some years ago, in the Northern Territory of Australia, and were at first taken for rubies and thus they were known in trade for some time afterwards as Australian rubies.

Almandine is widely distributed. Fine rhombic dodecahedra occur in the schistose rocks of the Zillertal, in Tyrol, and are sometimes cut and polished. An almandine in which the ferrous oxide is replaced partly by magnesia is found at Luisenfeld in German East Africa. In the United States there are many localities which yield almandine. Fine crystals of almandine embedded in mica-schist occur near Wrangell in Alaska. The coarse varieties of almandine are often crushed for use as an abrasive agent.

Cultural significance
Connecticut has designated almandine garnet as its state gemstone.

See also

 List of minerals

References

Garnet gemstones
Garnet group
Cubic minerals
Minerals in space group 230